The preliminary rounds of the Women's team kata competition at the 2018 World Karate Championships were held on November 8th, 2018 and the finals on November 11th, 2018.

Results

Finals

Repechage

Top Draw

Bottom Draw

References

External links
Draw

Women's team kata